What Women Will Do is a 1921 American silent drama film directed by Edward José and starring Anna Q. Nilsson, Earl Metcalfe, and Allan Forrest.

Cast
 Anna Q. Nilsson as Lily Gibbs 
 Earl Metcalfe as Jim Coring 
 Allan Forrest as Arthur Brent 
 George Majeroni as Dr. Joe 
 Jane Jennings as Mrs. Wade 
 Riley Hatch as Stryker

References

Bibliography
Ken Wlaschin. Silent Mystery and Detective Movies: A Comprehensive Filmography. McFarland, 2009.

External links

1921 films
1921 drama films
Silent American drama films
Films directed by Edward José
American silent feature films
1920s English-language films
Pathé Exchange films
Associated Exhibitors films
American black-and-white films
1920s American films